Mista was an American R&B group in the mid-1990s from Atlanta, Georgia. Under the production of Organized Noize, the group released their self-titled debut album in 1996, which produced the hit single "Blackberry Molasses" (#53 U.S., #13 U.S. R&B). However, the album did not follow in the same success and despite a second album being produced by Tim & Bob, it was never released. Due to management issues, the group split in 1997. Group member Bobby Valentino would go on to achieve success as a solo artist a few years later.

Discography

Albums

Singles

Soundtrack appearances

References

External links

American contemporary R&B musical groups
Musical groups established in 1996
Musical groups disestablished in 1998
Musical groups from Georgia (U.S. state)
Musical quartets
Ballad music groups